Diana S. Aga is a Filipino-American chemist who is the Henry M. Woodburn Chair at the University at Buffalo. She was awarded the 2017 American Chemical Society Schoellkopf Medal in recognition of her work in environmental chemistry. The Schoellkopf Medal is a local section award of the American Chemical Society.  Over the years, numerous University at Buffalo faculty have received this recognition.

Education 
Aga obtained a bachelors in agricultural chemistry from the University of the Philippines Los Bañosin 1988. She earned a Ph.D from the University of Kansas. For her Ph.D, she researched applications of immunoassays in agricultural chemistry. After graduating, she worked briefly for the United States Geological Survey and then joined ETH Zurich as a postdoctoral scholar for two years.

Research and career 
After a brief spell in industry, Aga returned to academia, and was appointed to the faculty at the University at Buffalo. Aga was awarded an National Science Foundation CAREER Award.

Aga does mass spectroscopy analysis to obtain detailed information on chemical composition and information on compounds in materials.  She is one of many scientists worldwide who have applied this mass spectroscopy technique to investigate pesticides in crops, contaminants in ground and wastewater, presence of antibiotics in wastewater, chemical compositions of brominated flame retardants (polybrominated diphenyl ethers, BDEs) which are toxic chemicals.

Aga is an editor of the Elsevier Journal of Hazardous Materials.

Awards and honours 
2007 New York Water Environment Association Kenneth Allen Memorial Award 
2013 University at Buffalo Excellence in Graduate Student Mentoring Award
2017 American Chemical Society Schoellkopf Medal
2017 American Chemical Society AGRO Fellow Award

Selected publications

References 

University at Buffalo faculty
University of Kansas alumni
University of the Philippines Los Baños alumni
American people of Filipino descent
American chemists
American women chemists
Year of birth missing (living people)
Living people
American women academics
21st-century American women